SS Normandy was a passenger vessel built for the London, Brighton and South Coast Railway in 1910.

History

She was built by Earle’s Shipbuilding in Hull and launched on 12 May 1910 and christened Normandy by Mrs. Funnell.

She was sold by the London, Brighton and South Coast Railway to the London and South Western Railway in 1912.

References

1910 ships
Steamships of the United Kingdom
Ships of the London and South Western Railway
Ships of the London, Brighton and South Coast Railway
Ships built on the Humber
Maritime incidents in 1918
Ships sunk by German submarines in World War I
World War I shipwrecks in the English Channel